Strathalbyn Road is a South Australian road connecting the towns of Aldgate, Mylor, Echunga, Macclesfield and Strathalbyn, designated part of route B33.

History
Strathalbyn Road previously served as the initial alignment of Princes Highway some time after it was first declared in South Australia in February 1922, initially defined along Mount Barker Road and then Strathalbyn Road from Adelaide via Aldgate, Mylor, Macclesfield, Strathalbyn, Langhorne Creek, crossing the Murray River at Wellington and then continuing along the present route beyond Meningie, By 1928, the route was re-aligned to run through Mount Barker and along Wellington Road via Wistow and Woodchester to Langhorne Creek, although by 1935 this alignment was changed to run via Nairne, Kanmantoo, Murray Bridge and Tailem Bend (along what is now known as the Old Princes Highway).

Major intersections

References

See also

Roads in South Australia